The 5th Rhythmic Gymnastics Asian Championships was held in Astana, Kazakhstan from 16 – 18 June 2011.

Medal winners

Medal table

Results

Team
The team final was held on 16 October 2010. The team final score was the total of top 10 scores.

Details

Individual All-around

Individual Hoop

Individual Ball

Individual Clubs

Individual Ribbon

References

Rhythmic Gymnastics Asian Championships
2011 in gymnastics  
2011 in Kazakhstani sport
International gymnastics competitions hosted by Kazakhstan